The Star of Bethlehem is a painting in watercolour by Sir Edward Burne-Jones depicting the Adoration of the Magi with an angel holding the star of Bethlehem. It was commissioned by the Corporation of the City of Birmingham for its new Museum and Art Gallery in 1887, two years after Burne-Jones was elected Honorary President of the Royal Birmingham Society of Artists. At 101 1/8 x 152 inches, The Star of Bethlehem was the largest watercolour of the 19th century. It was completed in 1890 and was first exhibited in 1891.

Origin of the composition

In 1886, John Prideaux Lightfoot had approached William Morris and Burne-Jones to create a tapestry as a gift for their alma mater Exeter College, Oxford, suggesting the Adoration of the Magi as a subject. The two quickly agreed.  Burne-Jones completed a 26 x 38 inch modello or design in watercolour and bodycolour heightened with gold in 1887. Morris and his assistant John Henry Dearle based the cartoons for the tapestry weavers on Burne-Jones's watercolour, changing the colour scheme and adding background details including the flowering plants characteristic of Dearle's tapestry work.  The Adoration of the Magi tapestry was woven by Morris & Co. at Merton Abbey over the next two years and displayed in their London showrooms at Easter 1890 before being presented to Exeter College.

The Adoration was ultimately the most commercially successful of all Morris & Co. tapestries.  Of the ten versions woven, one is in Eton College Chapel, one in the Hermitage Museum, St Petersburg, one in the Art Gallery of South Australia, and one at Manchester Metropolitan University. The original hangs in the Exeter College Chapel.

The painting

The Birmingham commission gave Burne-Jones an opportunity to revisit his tapestry design as a full-scale painting. The colour palette with its rich blue-greens differs greatly from both the original watercolour modello and the Morris tapestry, and its large size allowed him to add a wealth of fine detail not possible in the tapestry version, especially in the clothing.  Burne-Jones worked on a ladder, and wrote "a tiring thing it is physically to do, up my steps and down..."  A photograph by Barbara Leighton Sotheby, preserved as a platinum print by Frederick Hollyer, shows Burne-Jones on his ladder in front of the work-in-progress.  The Star of Bethlehem was completed in 1890 and exhibited at the New Gallery, London, in the spring of 1891 before being sent on to the Birmingham Museum & Art Gallery, where it remains.

Burne-Jones used a different pose of the angel holding the star, this time in a warm colour palette, to illustrate the wildflower called Star of Bethlehem (Ornithogalum umbellatum) in The Flower Book, a collection of watercolours on themes inspired by the names of flowers that he completed between 1882 and 1898.

Notes

References
Parry, Linda, ed., William Morris, Abrams, 1996, 
Wildman, Stephen: Edward Burne-Jones, Victorian artist-dreamer, Metropolitan Museum of Art, 1998, 
Wood, Christopher: Burne-Jones, Phoenix Illustrated, 1997,

External links
 Photograph of Burne-Jones  working on The Star of Bethlehem by Barbara Sotheby, in the V&A.
 Virtual tour of Exeter College Chapel, showing the Adoration of the Magi tapestry
 The Adoration of the Magi tapestry at the Hermitage Museum

1890 paintings
Paintings by Edward Burne-Jones
Adoration of the Magi in art
Collections of Birmingham Museum and Art Gallery
Angels in art
Star of Bethlehem
Watercolor paintings